Nines Lives Media is a Manchester-based television production company in the United Kingdom. It was formed in September 2007 by Cat Lewis. The company makes a range of television programming including documentaries, factual entertainment formats, drama documentaries, children's programs, and current affairs for all the major UK broadcasters, as well as some American channels. Nine Lives Media is one of two companies with an output deal for Channel 4's current affairs strand, Dispatches.

TV current affairs programming 
Dispatches (Channel 4) including the following episodes:
Britain's Benefit Experiment (Investigation into the UK government's plans to cut working tax credits);
Aldi's Supermarket Secrets (An undercover investigation into Aldi's supermarket);
999, Where's my Ambulance? (An investigation into how ambulance trusts massage their figures);
Where's My Missing Mail? (An undercover investigation into damaged deliveries, late arrivals, and missing parcels).
Panorama (BBC One) including the following episodes:
Jobs For the Boys? (Former England and Arsenal footballer Sol Campbell investigates the low unemployment rate for young black British men).
Gangs, Guns & The Police (An investigation into Salford's gang wars);
Can You Trust Your Bank? (An undercover investigation into Britain's high street banks following penalties for mis-selling insurance and investment products).
Failed by the NHS (BBC Three) (An investigative documentary following Jonny Benjamin, who suffers from schizophrenia and depression, as he meets other young people with mental health problems who feel they have not been given adequate care by Britain's national health service).

The Anti-Social Network (BBC Three) (Broadcaster Richard Bacon pursues and confronts online bullies – including his own – and discovers that unmasking 'trolls' can be a dangerous pursuit).

A&E: When Patients Attack (Channel 5) (About the security guards who protect the staff and patients at the Queen Elizabeth Hospital in Birmingham).

TV documentaries 
My Life (CBBC) including:
 I am Leo (13-year-old Leo tells the story of his journey to get his first 'male' passport and be accepted as a boy).
 Me, My Dad and His Kidney (Follows Raphael Havard and his father as they go through a kidney organ transplant operation).
 Marvelous Messy Minds (Libby, Ethan, and Oliver attempt to control their mental health to achieve some simple goals).
The Trouble with Mobility Scooters (BBC One) (Britain has 300,000 mobility scooters on its roads and pavements - more than any other country in Europe. This program explores how the mobility scooters give independence to their many users).

Ruby Wax's Mad Confessions (Channel 4) (Filmed at The Priory clinic, comedian Ruby Wax supports three successful businesspeople as they come to terms with their mental health problems).

Small Teen, Bigger World (BBC Three) (Follows 16-year-old Jasmine Burkitt who is 3'8" tall and wears clothes designed for seven- to eight-year-olds).

I Survived 9/11 (Bio) (Three accounts from British people trapped in and below the Twin Towers on 9/11).

Age Gap Love (Channel 5) (About age gap lovers who are determined to prove that age difference is no barrier to romance).

Pound Shop Wars (BBC One) (Behind the scenes of Pound world, one of Britain's biggest budget retailers).

Britain's Flashiest Families (Channel 5) (Follows people who love to spend as the United Kingdom comes out of recession).

TV drama documentaries 
Myra Hindley: The Untold Story (Channel 5) (Three-part drama documentary about child killer Myra Hindley).

Nightmare in Suburbia (Five series for the Crime and Investigation Network).

Awards
Nine Lives Media has won two BAFTAs, a national RTS Award, an International Emmy, and several North England awards. In January 2016, Nine Lives Media was named one of the 50 most creative companies in England by Creative England.

References

External links 
Nine Lives' nominations at 20th annual Royal Television Society North West Awards
Nine Lives Media wins International Emmy for transgender documentary
 Nine Lives Media to make 8 Dispatches programmes
 Nine Lives Media Official Website
 Nine Lives named one of the 50 most creative companies in England Manchester Evening News

Television production companies of the United Kingdom